is a 1941 Japanese comedy-drama film written and directed by Hiroshi Shimizu. It is based on the short story Yottsu no yubune (四つの湯槽, lit. "The four bathtubs") by Masuji Ibuse.

Plot
A diverse group of people is staying at a remote spa, including grumpy professor Katada, who regularly scolds young husband Hiroyasu for not being strict enough with his wife, an old man with his two grandsons Taro and Jiro, and soldier Nanmura. When Nanmura steps on a kanzashi, a woman's ornamental hairpin, in a well, he has to extend his stay. After the owner of the hairpin, Emi, a former resident, is located, she returns to the spa to apologise. Together with Taro and Jiro, she supports Nanmura with his daily exercises to regain his health. Although Emi and Nanmura share an unspoken mutual affection, they both know that their time together is finite: Nanmura will have to return to the military service, while Emi, a geisha who has fled her patron, faces an uncertain future.

Cast
 Kinuyo Tanaka as Emi
 Chishū Ryū as Takeshi Nanmura
 Tatsuo Saitō as Professor Katada
 Shin'ichi Himori as Hiroyasu
 Hideko Mimura as Hiroyasu's wife
 Kanji Kawahara as the old man
 Jun Yokoyama as Taro, grandson of the old man
 Masayoshi Ōtsuka as Jiro, grandson of the old man
 Hiroko Kawasaki as Okiku, Emi's geisha friend
 Takeshi Sakamoto as spa owner
 Kōji Matsumoto as staff manager
 Munenobu Yui as Toku, a masseur
 Tsuneo Ōsugi as Tsune, a masseur
 Kayoko Terada as maid

Reception
Upon its initial release (at the height of the Sino-Japanese War and shortly before Japan entered World War II), critic Akira Shimizu attacked Ornamental Hairpin as a "la-di-da" film in times when film stock was precious.

Legacy
Film scholar Alexander Jacoby describes Ornamental Hairpin as one of Shimizu's "richest and most complex achievements" which "boasted outstanding performances from Kinuyo Tanaka and Chishū Ryū". The British Film Institute included the film in its list of the best Japanese films since 1925.

Ornamental Hairpin was screened at the Berlin International Film Festival's "Forum" section in 2004 and at the Cinémathèque française in 2020 and 2021.

References

External links
 

1941 films
1941 comedy films
1941 drama films
Japanese comedy films
Japanese drama films
Japanese black-and-white films
Films based on short fiction
Films directed by Hiroshi Shimizu
Films with screenplays by Hiroshi Shimizu